Owen Township is one of twelve townships in Jackson County, Indiana, United States. As of the 2010 census, its population was 1,572 and it contained 677 housing units. It was named for the local Owen family of pioneer settlers.

Geography
The streams of Bee Creek, Clear Spring Creek and Little Salt Creek run through this township.

Unincorporated towns
 Clear Spring
 Kurtz
 Norman

Extinct towns
 Pleasantville

Adjacent townships
 Salt Creek Township (north)
 Pershing Township (northeast)
 Brownstown Township (east)
 Carr Township (south)
 Guthrie Township, Lawrence County (southwest)
 Pleasant Run Township, Lawrence County (west)

Cemeteries
The township contains three cemeteries: Bagwell, Bower, and Scott-Wray.

Major highways
  U.S. Route 50
  State Road 135
  State Road 235

References
 U.S. Board on Geographic Names (GNIS)
 United States Census Bureau cartographic boundary files

External links
 Indiana Township Association
 United Township Association of Indiana

Townships in Jackson County, Indiana
Townships in Indiana